This list of the tallest buildings and structures in Turkey ranks skyscrapers and towers in Turkey by height. An incomplete list of the tallest buildings in Turkey. For non-building structures, see List of tallest structures in Turkey:

Tallest skyscrapers in Turkey 
List of completed highest buildings of Turkey including spires and architectural details, but not antennas and flagpoles.

Cities with buildings over 100 meters

Buildings under construction in Turkey

Tallest visionary buildings in Turkey

Timeline of tallest buildings in Turkey

See also
List of tallest buildings in Ankara
List of tallest buildings in Istanbul
List of tallest buildings in Izmir
List of tallest buildings in Asia
List of tallest buildings in Europe
List of tallest buildings in the Balkans

References

Turkey
Turkey
Tallest